Mandell Maughan is a Portuguese-American film and television actress. She is best known for starring as Maggie in Me, Myself & I on CBS and Lisa Casper in Resident Alien. She also played Victoria King for four seasons in Bajillion Dollar Propertie$.

Early life 
Maughan was born and raised in Point Loma, a peninsula within southern California, often referred to as "Little Portugal".

Filmography

Awards and nominations

References

External links

Year of birth missing (living people)
Living people
American television actresses
American stand-up comedians
21st-century American actresses
Actresses from San Diego
Comedians from California
American women comedians
21st-century American comedians